Shreve, Crump & Low, a Boston, Massachusetts business, is the oldest purveyor of luxury goods in North America, responsible for  trophies such as the Davis Cup and the Cy Young Award.

History

Established in 1796 by watchmaker and silversmith John McFarlane, the company is one of the oldest jewelry stores in North America.

The present-day Shreve, Crump & Low is the last of a line of firms that began with John McFarlane, who opened a workshop across the street from Paul Revere. In the 1800s, the firm changed its name to Shreve's. In 1869 the firm of Shreve, Crump & Low was formed by merger.

Shreve, Crump & Low remained at their original location until their property was destroyed in the Great Boston Fire of 1872.  Its new location at 225 Washington Street pioneered the use of plate glass and artificial lighting in a retail establishment.  This Italianate building had showcases of black walnut trimmed with holly and ebony.

A relocation in 1891 brought Shreve, Crump & Low to its largest building, a six stories high Italian Renaissance style edifice of limestone and marble designed by Henry Forbes Bigelow. In 1929, Shreve, Crump & Low moved to 330 Boylston Street, one of the earliest examples of art deco architecture in New England. In 2006, under the ownership of local jeweler, David Walker, the firm opened a new store in Boston’s Back Bay at the corner of Boylston and Berkeley Streets. 

Shreve's has also sold antiques, imported fine linen and stationery, and exhibited artifacts from Ancient Greece and Rome. Shreve, Crump & Low is known for classic fine jewelry and timepieces, tableware, and Boston-themed gifts.  

In 1974, Shreve, Crump & Low opened a second location at The Mall at Chestnut Hill and it closed in 2009. In May 2012, the Boylston Street store relocated to 39 Newbury Street, Boston.

In 2014, another store was opened in Greenwich, CT.

Notable commissions
In 1835, orator and Massachusetts State Senator Daniel Webster was presented with a 400-ounce silver vase from this firm that was later donated to the Boston Public Library.
In 1840, Samuel Cunard was given a 30-inch Shreve's cup for helping to finance the RMS Britannia, the first steamship to travel between Liverpool and Boston.
In 1848, trustees of the Massachusetts General Hospital presented William Thomas Green Morton with a Shreve's silver box for discovering anesthetic ether.
In 1863, General George B. McClellan received a silver Shreve's box for his efforts in the American Civil War.
In the 1870s, Shreve, Crump & Low began working in semi-precious metals, creating the chandelier and sounding board for Trinity Church, Boston and lighting for the Old South Church and the Parker House Hotel.
In the 1880s, the firm provided lighting fixtures for patrons outside of Boston including the city hall in Providence, Rhode Island and King Kalakaua's Iolani Palace in Honolulu.
In 1899, a Harvard University tennis  player named Dwight F. Davis purchased a huge trophy from Shreve's to be awarded to the winner of a tournament to which they challenged a team from the United Kingdom.  The prize is now known as the Davis Cup.
In 1908, Shreve's created an elaborate silver cup to honor Boston Red Sox hero Cy Young.  After the pitcher's death in 1955 this became the Cy Young Award.

References

External links
official website

Jewelry retailers of the United States
American silversmiths
Economic history of Boston
Retail companies established in 1796
Luxury brands
1796 establishments in Massachusetts